Humphery is a surname. Notable people with the surname include:

Bobby Humphery (born 1961), American football player
Frederick Humphery (1841–1908), Australian politician
William Humphery (1827–1909), British politician

See also
Humfrey, given name and surname
Humphrey, given name and surname
Humphry, surname
Humphreys (surname)
Humphries, surname
Humphrys, surname